Arnold Pihlak (17 July 1902 – 1 November 1985) was an Estonian footballer.

Career
Pihlak earned 44 caps for the Estonian national team between 1920 and 1931, scoring 17 goals. He also participated at the 1924 Summer Olympics.

Pihlak spent time in Austria, playing for FK Austria Wien.

References

External links
 
 
 

1902 births
1985 deaths
Footballers from Tallinn
People from the Governorate of Estonia
Estonian footballers
Estonia international footballers
Footballers at the 1924 Summer Olympics
Olympic footballers of Estonia
JK Tallinna Kalev players
Estonian expatriate footballers
Estonian expatriate sportspeople in Austria
Expatriate footballers in Austria
FK Austria Wien players
Association football midfielders